Calliostoma gualterianum, common name Gualtieri's top shell, is a species of sea snail, a marine gastropod mollusk in the family Calliostomatidae.

Description
The size of the shell varies between 10 mm and 17 mm.
The imperforate, polished, solid shell has a conical-elevated shape with 9 whorls. It is yellowish-brown or olive, clouded with brown, the earlier 4 whorls dark bluish or greenish. The shell is spirally sulcate, the 2d whorl somewhat granulate. The rest of the whorls are smooth, flat, and with a narrow supra-sutural fasciole, which on the body whorl is not developed. The periphery is rounded angular. The base of the shell is smooth except for about 4 fine riblets around the axis. The aperture is smooth within. The nacreous columella is a trifle swollen at its base, and either purple or whitish inside.

Distribution
This species occurs in the Mediterranean Sea.

References

 Gofas, S.; Le Renard, J.; Bouchet, P. (2001). Mollusca, in: Costello, M.J. et al. (Ed.) (2001). European register of marine species: a check-list of the marine species in Europe and a bibliography of guides to their identification. Collection Patrimoines Naturels, 50: pp. 180–213

External links
 

gualterianum
Gastropods described in 1848
Taxa named by Rodolfo Amando Philippi